Belfast Pottinger was a constituency of the Parliament of Northern Ireland.

Boundaries
Belfast Pottinger was a borough constituency comprising part of eastern Belfast. It was created in 1929, when the House of Commons (Method of Voting and Redistribution of Seats) Act (Northern Ireland) 1929 introduced first-past-the-post elections throughout Northern Ireland.

Belfast Pottinger was created by the division of Belfast East into four new constituencies. It survived unchanged, returning one member of Parliament, until the Parliament of Northern Ireland was temporarily suspended in 1972, and then formally abolished in 1973.

Politics
The seat was a stronghold for the labour movement, although Unionist candidates always polled well and were occasionally able to win the seat.

Members of Parliament

Election results

References

Pottinger
Northern Ireland Parliament constituencies established in 1929
Northern Ireland Parliament constituencies disestablished in 1973